General Sutton may refer to:

Francis Arthur Sutton (1884–1944), British-born National Revolutionary Army major general for Chinese warlord Zhang Zuolin
Hugh Sutton (1867–1928), British Army major general
Loree Sutton (born 1959), U.S. Army brigadier general
Richard Sutton (British Army officer) (1674–1737), British Army lieutenant general

See also
Attorney General Sutton (disambiguation)